An UNMIK Travel Document was a passport-sized document issued to residents of Kosovo, who were not able to obtain a passport from Yugoslavia, for the purpose of foreign travel. The document was issued by the United Nations Interim Administration Mission in Kosovo (UNMIK) from 2000 to 2008. After the government of Kosovo started to issue their own passports, the UNMIK ceased issuing them. Existing documents retained their validity until expiry (the last ones expired in 2010).

The travel document was not a passport as it did not contain information on Nationality and as it was not issued by a sovereign state. The document carried UNMIK travel document/titre de voyage on the cover, contained 32 pages and was valid for two years. The document contained a machine readable strip. As the issuing authority was the UNMIK, the document had the official three-letter code "UNK" where normally the country code is placed. The document was the only other travel document issued by the United Nations besides the United Nations Laissez-Passer, which is mainly issued to employees of the UN and its specialised agencies.

Limited acceptance
As the status of Kosovo was and remains controversial, the document was not widely accepted. For those countries that did accept it, its non-passport status sometimes restricted its applications. For example, although the US did accept the UNMIK Travel Document, it did not place visa stickers in the document itself, but on a detached sheet.

Notes

References

Kosovo
Kosovo
Government of Kosovo
United Nations Mission in Kosovo
United Nations documents